Fricourt is a commune in the Somme department in Hauts-de-France in northern France.

Geography

History
Fricourt is about a kilometre from Mametz. It was close to the front line for much of World War I and saw particularly fierce fighting during the 1916, first 1918 and second 1918 Battles of the Somme and the first, second and third Battles of Albert. Fricourt is also one of the sites where large mines were exploded on the first day of the Battle of the Somme.

Population

See also
Capture of Fricourt
Fricourt German war cemetery
Communes of the Somme department

References

External links

 Fricourt cemetery.

Communes of Somme (department)